Brian DeRoo (born April 25, 1956) is a former American football wide receiver. He played for the Baltimore Colts from 1979 to 1981 and for the Montreal Concordes from 1982 to 1984.

References

1956 births
Living people
American football wide receivers
Redlands Bulldogs football players
Baltimore Colts players
Montreal Concordes players
People from Redlands, California